This is a list of electoral districts or ridings in Canada for the Canadian federal elections of 1935, 1940 and 1945.

Electoral Districts are constituencies that elect Members of Parliament in Canada's House of Commons every election.

Nova Scotia – 12 seats
Antigonish—Guysborough
Cape Breton North and Victoria
Cape Breton South
Colchester—Hants
Cumberland
Digby—Annapolis—Kings
Halifax*
Inverness—Richmond
Pictou
Queens—Lunenburg
Shelburne—Yarmouth—Clare

Prince Edward Island – 4 seats
King's
Prince
Queen's*

New Brunswick – 10 seats
Charlotte
Gloucester
Kent
Northumberland
Restigouche—Madawaska
Royal
St. John—Albert
Victoria—Carleton
Westmorland
York—Sunbury

Quebec – 65 seats
Argenteuil
Beauce
Beauharnois—Laprairie
Bellechasse
Berthier—Maskinongé
Bonaventure
Brome—Missisquoi
Cartier
Chambly—Rouville
Champlain
Chapleau
Charlevoix—Saguenay
Châteauguay—Huntingdon
Chicoutimi
Compton
Dorchester
Drummond—Arthabaska
Gaspé
Hochelaga
Hull
Jacques Cartier
Joliette—L'Assomption—Montcalm
Kamouraska
Labelle
Lake St-John—Roberval
Laurier
Laval—Two Mountains
Lévis
Lotbinière
Maisonneuve—Rosemont
Matapédia—Matane
Mégantic—Frontenac
Mercier
Montmagny—L'Islet
Mount Royal
Nicolet—Yamaska
Outremont
Pontiac
Portneuf
Quebec East
Quebec South
Quebec West and South
Québec—Montmorency
Richelieu—Verchères
Richmond—Wolfe
Rimouski
Shefford
Sherbrooke
St-Maurice—Laflèche
St. Ann
St. Antoine—Westmount
St. Denis
St. Henri
St. Hyacinthe—Bagot
St. James
St. Johns—Iberville—Napierville
St. Lawrence—St. George
St. Mary
Stanstead
Témiscouata
Terrebonne
Three Rivers
Vaudreuil—Soulanges
Verdun
Wright

Ontario – 82 seats
Algoma East
Algoma West
Brant
Brantford City
Broadview
Bruce
Carleton
Cochrane
Danforth
Davenport
Dufferin—Simcoe
Durham
Eglinton
Elgin
Essex East
Essex South
Essex West
Fort William
Frontenac—Addington
Glengarry
Greenwood
Grenville—Dundas
Grey North
Grey—Bruce
Haldimand
Halton
Hamilton East
Hamilton West
Hastings South
Hastings—Peterborough
High Park
Huron North
Huron—Perth
Kenora—Rainy River
Kent
Kingston City
Lambton West
Lambton—Kent
Lanark
Leeds
Lincoln
London
Middlesex East
Middlesex West
Muskoka—Ontario
Nipissing
Norfolk
Northumberland
Ontario
Ottawa East
Ottawa West
Oxford
Parkdale
Parry Sound
Peel
Perth
Peterborough West
Port Arthur
Prescott
Prince Edward—Lennox
Renfrew North
Renfrew South
Rosedale
Russell
Simcoe East
Simcoe North
Spadina
St. Paul's
Stormont
Timiskaming
Trinity
Victoria
Waterloo North
Waterloo South
Welland
Wellington North
Wellington South
Wentworth
York East
York North
York South
York West

Manitoba – 17 seats
Brandon
Churchill
Dauphin
Lisgar
Macdonald
Marquette
Neepawa
Portage la Prairie
Provencher
Selkirk
Souris
Springfield
St. Boniface
Winnipeg North
Winnipeg North Centre
Winnipeg South
Winnipeg South Centre

Saskatchewan – 21 seats
Assiniboia
Humboldt
Kindersley
Lake Centre
Mackenzie
Maple Creek
Melfort
Melville
Moose Jaw
North Battleford
Prince Albert
Qu'Appelle
Regina City
Rosetown—Biggar
Rosthern
Saskatoon City
Swift Current
The Battlefords
Weyburn
Wood Mountain
Yorkton

Alberta – 17 seats
Acadia
Athabaska
Battle River
Bow River
Calgary East
Calgary West
Camrose
Edmonton East
Edmonton West
Jasper—Edson
Lethbridge
Macleod
Medicine Hat
Peace River
Red Deer
Vegreville
Wetaskiwin

British Columbia – 16 seats
Cariboo
Comox—Alberni
Fraser Valley
Kamloops
Kootenay East
Kootenay West
Nanaimo
New Westminster
Skeena
Vancouver Centre
Vancouver East
Vancouver North
Vancouver South
Vancouver—Burrard
Victoria
Yale

Yukon – 1 seat
Yukon
*returned two members

1933-1947